Sebastian Nicol Capozucchi Collant (born 23 December 1995) is a Chilean professional footballer who plays as a defender.

Club career

New York Cosmos B and Platense
Capozucchi began his career with NPSL side New York Cosmos B, joining the club in 2016. He re-signed with the club for their 2017 season following a spell in Argentina with Platense, where he appeared for the club's reserve team.

Move to Italy
Over three years, Capozucchi played for a trio of Serie D side Italy. Starting with Troina in 2017, he then spent a season on loan with Paternò, where he and the team went on to allow the second fewest goals in the league. He was then signed by Marina Di Ragusa in 2018, helping the club to win the league title that season.

Return to the United States
In 2019, Capozucchi returned to the United States and spent time in the NPSL again with Atlantic City FC. He then joined Milwaukee Torrent later in the year for the NPSL Founders Cup.

Detroit City FC
In 2020, Capozucchi signed with NISA side Detroit City, making five regular season appearances and two post-season appearances for the club during a season affected by the COVID-19 pandemic.

Chattanooga Red Wolves
On March 5, 2021, Capozucchi signed with USL League One side Chattanooga Red Wolves. He made his debut on May 8, 2021, starting in a 1–0 win over North Texas SC.

Personal
Capozucchi was born in Chile, born to a Chilean mother and Argentine father, Walter Capozucchi, who was also a professional soccer player. Capozucchi lived in Argentina, Chile and Guatemala all before the age of nine. After which, Sebastian moved to New Jersey in the United States. He played prep soccer at Memorial High School in West New York, New Jersey, graduating in 2013.

References

External links
 Profile at Chattanooga Red Wolves

1995 births
Living people
Chilean footballers
American soccer players
Association football defenders
New York Cosmos B players
Club Atlético Platense footballers
Atlantic City FC players
Detroit City FC players
Chattanooga Red Wolves SC players
Serie D players
National Premier Soccer League players
National Independent Soccer Association players
USL League One players
Venezuelan expatriate footballers
Expatriate footballers in Argentina
Expatriate footballers in Italy
Memorial High School (West New York, New Jersey) alumni
Soccer players from New Jersey
Sportspeople from Hudson County, New Jersey
People from West New York, New Jersey